"Living in Harmony" is a song by British singer Cliff Richard, released as a single in July 1972. It peaked at number 12 on the UK Singles Chart.

Release
"Living in Harmony" was written by songwriting duo Alan Tarney and Trevor Spencer. Tarney would go on to write as well as produce numerous songs for Richard. It was released as single with the B-side "Empty Chairs", a song written by Don Mclean for his album American Pie. Both tracks were arranged by and feature the orchestra of Nick Ingman. Richard has described "Living in Harmony" as being "the end of times", as it was the last single of Richard's to be produced by Norrie Paramor (he did also produce "An Old Accordion", the B-side to the follow-up single "A Brand New Song").

It was first recorded by Olivia Newton-John for her second album Olivia, released in August 1972. Richard had heard her version and said to manager Peter Gormley, "It's a fabulous song, but I don't like the arrangement very much" and that "somehow or another, it seems to me a commercial song but it doesn't sound commercial". So, Richard has said, "we really worked on making it commercial. And in essence it was commercial, but I think somehow – I don't know what they did to their session, but it was too fast and everything. And we really got down and I think we came up – I mean, with all love, Olivia – I think we did a better version of it".

Track listing
7": Columbia / DB 8917
 "Living in Harmony" – 3:21
 "Empty Chairs" – 3:24

Personnel
 Cliff Richard – vocals, backing vocals
 The Breakaways – backing vocals
 Nick Ingman Orchestra – all instrumentation

Charts

References

Cliff Richard songs
Olivia Newton-John songs
1972 singles
1972 songs
Songs written by Alan Tarney
Columbia Graphophone Company singles
Song recordings produced by Norrie Paramor